The Charles Homer Davis House is a historic house located at 381 West Neck Road in Lloyd Harbor, Suffolk County, New York.

Once owned by pop star Taylor Dayne (Dayne of Thrones)

Description and history 
Built in 1869 and designed by Charles Homer Davis, it is a clapboard-sided, three-bay wide, double-pile, -story Second Empire–style house. It features a truncated tower on its south side, a porch that spans the ground floor on the front side and a mansard roof.

It was added to the National Register of Historic Places on February 22, 2006.

References

Houses on the National Register of Historic Places in New York (state)
Second Empire architecture in New York (state)
Houses completed in 1869
Houses in Suffolk County, New York
1869 establishments in New York (state)
National Register of Historic Places in Suffolk County, New York